Victor Waters (31 May 1876 – 17 November 1951) was a New Zealand cricketer. He played in twelve first-class matches for Wellington from 1895 to 1906.

See also
 List of Wellington representative cricketers

References

External links
 

1876 births
1951 deaths
New Zealand cricketers
Wellington cricketers
Cricketers from Wellington City
North Island cricketers